Thecodiplosis is a genus of gall midges, insects in the family Cecidomyiidae. There are about six described species in Thecodiplosis.

Species
These six species belong to the genus Thecodiplosis:
 Thecodiplosis brachyntera (Schwagrichen, 1835) c g
 Thecodiplosis brachynteroides (Osten Sacken, 1863) i c g b
 Thecodiplosis japonensis Uchida & Inouye, 1955 c g
 Thecodiplosis piniradiatae (Snow and Mills, 1900) i c g
 Thecodiplosis piniresinosae Kearby, 1963 i c g
 Thecodiplosis pinirigidae (Packard, 1878) i c g
Data sources: i = ITIS, c = Catalogue of Life, g = GBIF, b = Bugguide.net

References

Further reading

 
 
 
 
 

Cecidomyiinae
Cecidomyiidae genera
Articles created by Qbugbot